Port Ellen distillery is located in Port Ellen on the isle of Islay, Scotland. It initially operated between 1825 and 1983 when production shut down.

History
Port Ellen was established as a malt mill in 1825, and then developed as a distillery under John Ramsay from 1833 to 1892.  The warehouses he built still exist and are listed buildings. The distillery was acquired by the Distillers Company Limited in 1925, was closed in 1930 and rebuilt in 1966/1967. It continued in production throughout the 1970s and was closed in 1983, although supplies of its single malt whisky are still available. When Port Ellen was closed in 1983, Diageo did knock down some of the buildings, repurposed others, and destroyed the stills. The distillery houses a malting which continues to supply all Islay distilleries, as per an agreement signed in 1987. The dwindling stocks of Port Ellen whisky are owned by Diageo; due to the closing of the distillery, its whisky is a collectors item.

On 9 October 2017, Diageo announced that the distillery would reopen in 2020, following a £35 million investment in re-opening both Port Ellen and also their closed Brora distillery in Sutherland, which also closed in 1983. Diageo suggested the first new release might be of a 12 year old expression, i.e., in 2032, but have left the door open for possibly earlier releases. On 8 May 2019, Diageo submitted plans to revive the distillery, and to build a new stillhouse. Diageo say they are going to considerable efforts to recreate as similar as possible new stills, and point to factory records from the 1980s, and have former Port Ellen employees working for them elsewhere on Islay to assist in an accurate recreation of the Port Ellen style.

The Distillery build is currently under the management of Alexander McDonald, an Islay resident with previous positions held in Kilchoman, Lagavulin and Caol Ila distillery.  plans are for the distillery to reopen in 2023.

In 2022, a rare 1979 cask of Port Ellen whisky was auctioned by Sotheby's for £875,000. It was sold in a lot which included an artwork in Murano glass by artist and designer Ini Archibong. Diageo announced that five percent of the hammer price would be donated to support Care International's work in Ukraine.

References

Bibliography

 

Whisky distilleries in Islay
Port Ellen